Rising Sun Rock Festival is an annual rock festival held in Ishikari, Hokkaido, Japan. The two-day event is organized by WESS. It chiefly features Japanese rock and indie performers.

Festival summary by year

Performances

1999
The 1999 festival took place on 21 August 1999.

2000
The 2000 festival took place on 19 August 2000.

2001
The 2001 festival took place from 17 to 18 August 2001.

2002
The 2002 festival took place from 16 to 17 August 2002.

2003
The 2003 festival took place from 15 to 16 August 2003.

2004
The 2004 festival took place from 13 to 14 August 2004.

2005
The 2005 festival took place from 19 to 20 August 2005.

2006
The 2006 festival took place from 18 to 19 August 2006.

2007
The 2007 festival took place from 17 to 18 August 2007.

2008
The 2008 festival took place from 15 to 16 August 2008.

2009
Rising Sun Rock Festival in EZO 2009 Started on August 14 at 15:00 JST (UTC +9), and Ended on August 16 05:40 JST (UTC +9).

2010
Rising Sun Rock Festival 2010 in EZO's website was launched on January 6, 2010, the top three acts from the RISING STAR section of the festival from 2006, 2007, 2008, and 2009 will all take place in a voting contest between March 15 and May 7, with the results to be in by mid-June. The winner will perform on the Green Oasis stage. Requests for bands are currently open, and the English mirror site will be launched on March 1, 2010. A Twitter page has been launched for the event as well.

2011
The 2011 festival took place from 12 to 13 August 2011.

2012
The 2012 festival took place from 10 to 11 August 2012.

2013
The 2013 festival took place from 16 to 17 August 2013.

2014
The 2014 festival took place from 15 to 16 August 2014.

2015
The 2015 festival took place from 14 to 15 August 2015.

2016
The 2016 festival took place from 12 to 13 August 2016.

2017
The 2017 festival took place from 11 to 12 August 2017.

2018
The 2018 festival took place from 10 to 11 August 2018.

2019
The festival took place from the 16 to 17 August 2019. Because of Typhoon Krosa, day 1 had to be cancelled.

Gallery

References

External links 

 

Music festivals in Japan
Summer festivals
Rock festivals in Japan
Music festivals established in 1999
Festivals in Hokkaido
1999 establishments in Japan